Orientations for the Chinese Clergy is a June 28, 2019 document of the Holy See, published in full on the Feast of the Sacred Heart on the Vatican's official news site, that answers various questions – specifically, about conscience and conscientious objection – asked by the bishops of the Catholic Church in China, and that offers guidelines regarding the mandatory civil registration of religious leaders in China.

See also
 Laogai

References

Documents of the Catholic Church
Catholic Church in China
Catholic theology and doctrine
Conscientious objection